We Wish You a Metal Xmas and a Headbanging New Year is a compilation album of Christmas songs played by an all-star collection of hard rock and heavy metal artists released on October 14, 2008.  Each track puts together a unique supergroup playing a traditional Christmas selection.

Track listing
 "We Wish You A Merry Xmas" (Jeff Scott Soto / Bruce Kulick / Bob Kulick / Chris Wyse / Ray Luzier)
 "Run Rudolph Run" (Lemmy / Billy F. Gibbons / Dave Grohl)
 "Santa Claws is Coming to Town" (Alice Cooper / John 5 / Billy Sheehan / Vinny Appice)
 "God Rest You Merry, Gentlemen" (Ronnie James Dio / Tony Iommi / Rudy Sarzo / Simon Wright)
 "Silver Bells" (Geoff Tate / Carlos Cavazo / James Lomenzo / Ray Luzier)
 "Little Drummer Boy" (Doug Pinnick / George Lynch / Billy Sheehan / Simon Phillips)
 "Santa Claus Is Back in Town" (Tim "Ripper" Owens / Steve Morse / Juan Garcia / Marco Mendoza / Vinny Appice)
 "Silent Night" (Chuck Billy / Scott Ian / Jon Donais / Chris Wyse / John Tempesta)
 "Deck the Halls" (Oni Logan / Craig Goldy / Tony Franklin / John Tempesta)
 "Grandma Got Run Over By A Reindeer" (Stephen Pearcy / Tracii Guns / Bob Kulick / Billy Sheehan / Greg Bissonette)
 "Rockin' Around the Xmas Tree" (Joe Lynn Turner / Bruce Kulick / Bob Kulick / Rudy Sarzo / Simon Wright)
 "Happy Xmas (War Is Over)" (Tommy Shaw / Steve Lukather / Marco Mendoza / Kenny Aronoff)

Bonus tracks:
 "O Christmas Tree" (Doro Pesch / Frankie Banali/ Michael Schenker / Tony Franklin)
 "Auld Lang Syne" (Girlschool)
 "Frosty The Snowman" (Bumblefoot / Chris Chaney/ Kenny Aronoff / Steve "Lips" Kudlow)
 "Rudolph the Red Nosed Reindeer" (Dez Fafara / Blasko / Doug Aldrich / John Tempesta)

Personnel
 Mike Exeter – Engineer

References

External links
Blogcritics.org
Heavymetal.about.com

2008 compilation albums
2008 Christmas albums
Christmas compilation albums
Hard rock compilation albums
Heavy metal compilation albums
Heavy metal Christmas albums